Joseph William Gibson (born 17 January 2001) is an English professional footballer who plays as a midfielder for Championship club Middlesbrough.

Club career
Born in Chilton, Gibson joined Middlesbrough at under-9 level and went onto make his debut during the 2021–22 campaign, featuring in their FA Cup third round tie against Mansfield Town, playing for 58 minutes before being replaced by Matt Crooks in the 3–2 victory.

Career statistics

References

External links

2001 births
Living people
English footballers
Association football midfielders
Middlesbrough F.C. players
English Football League players